Kuhsareh (also Romanized as Kūhsāreh and Kūhsārah; also known as Kūhsar Deh) is a village in Hir Rural District, Hir District, Ardabil County, Ardabil Province, Iran. At the 2006 census, its population was 612, in 136 families.

References 

Towns and villages in Ardabil County